Sylvia Wairimu Mulinge (née Sylvia Wairimu), is a Kenyan businesswoman and corporate executive. Since 1 October 2022, she serves as the chief executive officer of MTN Uganda, replacing Wim Vanhelleputte, who was promoted to regional executive responsible for operations in Congo-Brazzaville, Guinea-Bissau, Guinea-Conakry and Liberia.

Before that, from November 2018 until September 2022, she served as the Chief Customer Officer at Safaricom, reporting directly to the chief executive officer of the telecommunications company.

Previously, from 1 October 2018 until 2 November 2018, she served as the Director, Special Projects at Safaricom,

Before that, she was the Director of the Consumer Business Unit at Safaricom, the largest telecommunications company in Kenya.

Background and education
She was born in Kenya and attended St. Xaviers Primary School (1983-1990) in the town of Nakuru, and Mary Mount Secondary School (1991-1994) for her elementary and secondary education. She studied at the University of Nairobi, graduating in 2000 with a Bachelor of Science degree in Food Science and Technology.

Career
She began her career in August 2004, at Unilever, the European consumer products conglomerate, working as the Assistant Regional Brand Manager in the laundry division, based in Durban, South Africa. After nine months in South Africa, she was transferred to Kenya, as the brand manager for Sunlight, a Unilever brand. She worked there for another nine months, from May 2005 until January 2006, based in Nairobi.

In February 2006 she was hired by Safaricom Limited as the manager responsible for the company's pre-pay product, working in that capacity until November 2007, when she was promoted to the rank of Head of Retail, in which position she served until August 2009. For the 21 months, from August 2009 until April 2011, she worked as the Head of Safaricom Business,  responsible for sales. In May 2011, she was promoted to General Manager for Enterprise Business, working in that capacity for the next four years. In May 2015, she was promoted to the position of Director of Consumer Business at Safaricom. At Safaricom, she rose through the ranks to become a member of the senior management team at the company.

Other considerations
In 2014, Sylvia Wairimu Mulinge was named among the "Top 40 Women Under 40 in Kenya 2014" by Business Daily Africa, a daily business newspaper published by the Nation Media Group.

In April 2018, Sylvia Mulinge was named the chief executive officer-designate at Vodacom Tanzania, replacing Ian Ferrao. The position is based in Dar es Salaam, Tanzania. The appointment was effective 1 June 2018.

In September 2018, Vodacom Tanzania enounced that the Tanzanian
authorities had declined to issue Sylvia Mulinge with a working
permit. The company said at the time that it would seek another individual for the position.  Effective 1 October 2018 she was reassigned as the director of special projects at Safaricom, reporting directly to the company CEO.

See also
 Sanda Ojiambo
 Iddah Asin
 Robert Collymore

References

External links
 Chairman Mbire hands over instruments of leadership as new MTN CEO resumes work As of 7 October 2022.
  Safaricom Executive to be Charged With Causing Pedestrian's Death 

Living people
1977 births
University of Nairobi alumni
21st-century Kenyan businesswomen
21st-century Kenyan businesspeople
People from Nairobi
Safaricom people
Kenyan women business executives
Kenyan chief executives
Kikuyu people
Kenyan expatriates in Uganda